Logarithmic can refer to:

 Logarithm, a transcendental function in mathematics
 Logarithmic scale, the use of the logarithmic function to describe measurements
 Logarithmic spiral, 
 Logarithmic growth
 Logarithmic distribution, a discrete probability distribution
 Natural logarithm